.ro is the Internet country code top-level domain (ccTLD) for Romania. It is administered by the National Institute for R&D in Informatics. As of December 2007, about 250,000 domains were registered under the .ro domain. In June 2008 there were around 6.8 million Google results for the .ro domain. In June 2012, there were 732,867 .ro domain names, while in September 2017, there were 928,357.

References

External links
 Romanian Top Level Domain Registry
 IANA .ro whois information
 National Institute for R&D in Informatics (ICI) 
 Romanian National R&D Computer Network (RNC - ICI project)

Country code top-level domains
Telecommunications in Romania
Internet in Romania
Council of European National Top Level Domain Registries members
Mass media in Romania
1993 establishments in Romania

sv:Toppdomän#R